Straight Up Sewaside is the second album by the hip hop duo Das EFX. The album reached #20 on the Billboard 200. The album achieved gold status.

Critical reception
Spin wrote that "on Straight Up Sewaside, the fidgeting raps keep coming, with pumping, vinyl-hissing production, and that was enough. In this case, more of the same was impressive and even admirable."

Track listing 
All tracks produced by Solid Scheme, except where noted

Charts

Weekly charts

Year-end charts

References

1993 albums
Das EFX albums
East West Records albums